Betpak-Dala or Betpaqdala (Betpaqdala; from Turkic batpak, “swampy,” or Persian bedbaht, “unlucky” and Turkic dala, “plain”; Russian: Бетпак-Дала or Сeверная Голодная степь, lit. Hungry Steppe) is a desert zone in the Ulytau, Karaganda, Turkestan and Zhambyl regions, Kazakhstan.

History
In Autumn 2014, English explorer Jamie Bunchuk completed an expedition to cross the Betpak-Dala to its fullest longitudinal extent, from Lake Balkash in the east to the Sarysu River in the west. He also ran 190 miles, nearly eight marathons, back-to-back, over the course of eight days within the region.

An epizootic of pasteurellosis occurred in Betpak-Dala in May 2015, in which more than 120,000 saiga antelope — representing more than a third of the global population — were confirmed dead.

Geography
The Betpak-Dala is located between the lower reaches of the Sarysu River, the Chu River, and Lake Balkhash. In the north, near the 46°30’ parallel, Betpak-Dala borders on the Kazakh Uplands, an area of low, rounded, isolated hills. To the southwest lies the Ashchykol Depression.
Elevations are greatest in the east.

The western part of Betpak-Dala is composed of folded Mesozoic rock and horizontally layered Paleogene friable rock (sand, sandstone, clay, and conglomerates). The eastern hilly region has a plicate structure and is composed of Lower Paleozoic sedimentary-metamorphic rock series and granite. The climate is sharply continental. Summers are dry and hot; winters are cold with little snow.

There are many shallow, often Sor-type of saline lakes, such as Arys, Buralkynyn Tuzy and Karakoin. Underground waters, emerging in places, are abundant. The predominant soils are gray-brown desert solonchak and solonets.

Flora
The western region of Betpak-Dala is an argillaceous sagebrush desert; Anabasis salsa grows in the salt-marsh depressions, while Pamirian winterfat (Krascheninnikovia ceratoides) and Siberian pea shrub (Caragana arborescens) grow on the sand dunes. In the east the argillaceous desert merges with the stony desert where Salsola arbuscula grows on the rocky hills. Betpak-Dala is used as a spring and autumn grazing land.

See also 
Geography of Kazakhstan
Mirzacho'l, known in Russian as the Golodnaya Steppe (lit. Hungry Steppe)

References

External links 
 

Natural regions of Asia
Deserts of Central Asia
Deserts of Kazakhstan
Ulytau Region
Karaganda Region
Turkistan Region
Jambyl Region